Kwame Raoul (born September 30, 1964) is an American lawyer and politician who has been the 42nd Attorney General of Illinois since 2019.  He is a member of the Democratic Party.

Raoul represented the 13th district in the Illinois Senate from 2004 to 2019. Initially appointed to fill the seat vacated by Barack Obama when Obama was elected to the U.S. Senate in 2004, Raoul won subsequent election and reelection. He served as Chair of the Senate Judiciary Committee, Vice Chair of the Senate Criminal Law Committee, and as a member of the Executive, Gaming, Insurance and Public Health Committees.

Early life 
Raoul was born in Chicago to Haitian immigrant parents Dr. Janin and  Marie Therese Raoul. Raoul earned his B.A. degree in political science from DePaul University and went on to receive his J.D. degree from Chicago-Kent College of Law.

Early political career
Raoul unsuccessfully challenged incumbent 4th ward Chicago alderman Toni Preckwinkle in both the 1995 and 1999 aldermanic elections.

Senate career 
Raoul was appointed on November 6, 2004 to fill the state Senate vacancy caused by the resignation of his predecessor, Barack Obama, who had just been elected to the United States Senate.

Since his arrival in Springfield, Raoul has successfully advanced legislation promoting civil justice, early childhood education, domestic violence prevention and political reform. In his first year in the General Assembly, Raoul established a progressive agenda. His work led to the passage of laws expanding access to early voting in Illinois, and the state's Low Income Energy Assistance Program and a crack down on the Pay Day loan industry.

Raoul has sponsored a bill that would require grants distributed by Illinois State Board of Education to early childhood education and preschool programs to be used to improve and expand the quality of services. He has also backed legislation aimed at easing the reintegration of ex-offenders into the community. His legislation allows good conduct credit to be awarded to inmates who earn their high school diplomas or GEDs, as well as inmates who participate in substance abuse programs.

Raoul has championed legislation on criminal justice reform including the recent historic legislation that abolishes the death penalty and legislation creating the Torture Inquiry Commission. He also championed legislation aimed at breaking the code of silence by deterring intimidation of those who cooperate with law enforcement officers.

Raoul has supported efforts to create and retain jobs in the State of Illinois including convention center reforms and a multibillion dollars capital bill. He has been the chief sponsor of legislation to extend the Economic Development for a Growing Economy (EDGE) tax credit to companies in order to retain and create jobs in our state. He recently championed the effort to pass comprehensive workers compensation reform that will save Illinois employers in excess of half a billion dollars.

As chairman of the Senate's Pension and Investment Committee, Sen. Raoul has fought hard for pension ethics reform and has led efforts to expand opportunities for minority and women-owned financial service firms and ridding the State's pension systems of corruption. As chairman of the Senate's Redistricting Committee, Sen. Raoul introduced legislation that created the Illinois Voting Rights Act to protect racial and language minorities in the legislative redistricting process. In addition, Raoul serves as Chair of the Judiciary Committee, Vice-Chair of the Criminal Law Committee and a member of the Executive, Gaming, Insurance and Public Health Committees.

Raoul was among the candidates Illinois Governor Rod Blagojevich considered to fill  Obama's Senate seat upon Obama's victory in the 2008 presidential election. Raoul withdrew his name from consideration, wary of entering into a quid pro quo with the governor, who later became embroiled in a corruption scandal over his attempt to sell the appointment.

Raoul was succeeded in the Illinois Senate by activist Robert Peters.

Outside the Senate 

Raoul served as  a partner of the law firm of Quarles & Brady with a practice concentrating on employment and labor litigation. Raoul is a former Cook County prosecutor and previously worked as senior counsel for the City Colleges of Chicago.  He has also directed volunteer legal clinics in his district. He has served on the board of directors of the Cook County Bar Association and the North Central Province of Kappa Alpha Psi Fraternity.  He has coached Hyde Park Biddy Basketball and has been an AYSO soccer volunteer. He has participated in voter registration campaigns with Rainbow/PUSH and has served as a volunteer Election Day lawyer.

Attorney General of Illinois

2018 election

In September 2017, Raoul launched his campaign for Attorney General of Illinois, originally he was expected to run for Mayor of Chicago in 2019 but declined. Among a crowded field of eight Democratic candidates, Raoul has received several significant endorsements: Congressman Danny K. Davis of Illinois's 7th congressional district, President of the Illinois Senate John Cullerton, the Chicago Teachers Union, the Cook County Democratic Party, and the Madison County Democratic Party.

According to Raoul's campaign website, he supports the ratification of the Equal Rights Amendment and co-sponsored the Equal Wage Act in Illinois, which was later vetoed by Governor Rauner. He believes that abortion should be safe, legal, and accessible. He supports increasing gun restrictions and reforming the criminal justice system.

Raoul won the Democratic primary election on March 20, 2018 winning 30% of the vote in an eight way primary contest that included, among others, former governor Pat Quinn. In the general election, he faced Republican nominee Erika Harold, a former Miss America and Champaign/Urbana, Illinois attorney who won her two way contest with 59% of the vote. On November 6, 2018, Raoul defeated Harold with 54% of the vote.

2022 election

Raoul won re-election to a second term and ran in the Democratic primary unopposed.
On November 8, 2022, he defeated Republican Tom DeVore in the general election, receiving 54% of the vote.

Personal life 
Raoul lives in the Hyde Park/Kenwood area, he is married to Dr. Lisa Moore and has two children, Che and Mizan. He is also a life member of Kappa Alpha Psi fraternity (Theta Zeta chapter) and a member of the Chicago Chapter of 100 Black Men. Raoul is a prostate cancer survivor. On June 16, 2020, Raoul's office announced that he tested positive for COVID-19.

Electoral history

References

External links

Government website
Kwame Raoul for Attorney General
Biography, bills and committees at the 98th Illinois General Assembly
By session: 98th, 97th, 96th, 95th, 94th, 93rd

|-

1964 births
21st-century American politicians
American politicians of Haitian descent
DePaul University alumni
Haitian emigrants to the United States
Illinois Attorneys General
Illinois Institute of Technology alumni
Democratic Party Illinois state senators
Lawyers from Chicago
Living people
Politicians from Chicago
United Church of Christ members